Tobias Jan Håkan Linderoth (born 21 April 1979) is a professional football manager and former player, who is the current manager of Swedish club Skövde AIK. He played as a midfielder, and played professionally in Sweden, Norway, England, Denmark, and Turkey before injuries forced him to retire in 2010. Born in France, he won 76 caps for the Sweden national team and represented them at two FIFA World Cups (2002 and 2006) and two UEFA European Championships (2004 and 2008).

Club career
Linderoth played for Stabæk and then an unremarkable spell at Everton marred by injury, where he scored once against Charlton Athletic in the League Cup, before he joined Copenhagen in the summer of 2004. He was a regular first team player for three seasons in Copenhagen and was made captain for the team that won two Danish championships and qualified for the group stage of the UEFA Champions League.

On 12 June 2007, Linderoth signed a three-year contract with Turkish side Galatasaray, where he wore the number 6.

On 22 January 2010, Linderoth was released by Galatasaray prematurely. On 12 November 2010, Linderoth officially announced the end of his career as a player. He stated he was aiming to become a coach like his father. He now works as a youth team coach at Elfsborg.

International career
Linderoth was eligible for France because he was born there but he chose the Sweden national team.

Linderoth was a midfield dynamo on the Sweden national team where he also was assistant captain. Tobias played for Sweden in the Euro 2004 and Euro 2008, as well as in the 2002 and 2006 FIFA World Cup tournaments. In one game at the World Cup in 2002, he ran  during the 96 minutes of the match – not an unusual feature for the hard-working midfielder.

On 26 May 2008, Linderoth scored his second international goal, the only goal in a 1–0 win over Slovenia in a pre-Euro 2008 friendly warm-up.

On 6 September 2008, during a 2010 FIFA World Cup qualification game against Albania, he was injured and had to be substituted in the 6th minute – this was to be the last game he played for Sweden.

Managerial career
After retiring, Linderoth spent a decade as the manager for IF Elfsborg's youth academy. On 18 November 2020, Linderoth was named the manager of Skövde AIK.

Personal life
He is the son of football coach Anders Linderoth, a former Swedish international who played in the 1978 FIFA World Cup in Argentina, and Tobias was born in France during Anders' spell at Marseille. On 25 October 2006, Tobias and his wife Maria became parents when she gave birth to their first child.

Career statistics

Club

Also played 22 (2004–05, 2005–06, 2006–07) Royal League matches where he scored 1 goal.
Also played 3 (2005, 2006) Tele2 LigaCup matches (unofficial).

International

Scores and results list Sweden's goal tally first, score column indicates score after each Linderoth goal.

Managerial

Honours
IF Elfsborg
 Division 1 Södra: 1996

FC Copenhagen
Danish Superliga: 2005–06, 2006–07
Royal League: 2004–05, 2005–06

Galatasaray
Süper Lig: 2007–08
Turkish Super Cup: 2008

Individual
Swedish midfielder of the year: 2006, 2007
FC Copenhagen Spring Profile: 2006

Notes

References

External links

Everton profile
Premier League profile

1979 births
Living people
Footballers from Marseille
Association football midfielders
Swedish footballers
Sweden international footballers
Sweden under-21 international footballers
Sweden youth international footballers
French footballers
French people of Swedish descent
Allsvenskan players
Eliteserien players
Premier League players
Danish Superliga players
Süper Lig players
Feyenoord players
IFK Hässleholm players
IF Elfsborg players
Stabæk Fotball players
Everton F.C. players
F.C. Copenhagen players
Galatasaray S.K. footballers
2002 FIFA World Cup players
UEFA Euro 2004 players
2006 FIFA World Cup players
UEFA Euro 2008 players
Swedish football managers
Skövde AIK managers
IF Elfsborg non-playing staff
Swedish expatriate footballers
Swedish expatriate sportspeople in the Netherlands
Expatriate footballers in the Netherlands
Swedish expatriate sportspeople in Norway
Expatriate footballers in Norway
Swedish expatriate sportspeople in England
Expatriate footballers in England
Swedish expatriate sportspeople in Denmark
Expatriate men's footballers in Denmark
Swedish expatriate sportspeople in Turkey
Expatriate footballers in Turkey